The Olympus Zuiko Digital ED 40-150mm 1:4.0-5.6 is an interchangeable moderate telezoom lens for the Four Thirds system. It was announced by Olympus Corporation on September 27, 2004.

References
http://www.dpreview.com/products/olympus/lenses/oly_40-150_4-5p6/specifications

External links
 

Camera lenses introduced in 2004
040-150mm f 4.0-5.6 ED